Granulorsidis is a monotypic genus in the family Cerambycidae described by Stephan von Breuning in  1980. Its only species, Granulorsidis flavidosignatus, was described by Per Olof Christopher Aurivillius in 1927.

References

Lamiini
Beetles described in 1927
Monotypic Cerambycidae genera